This article is the Electoral history of Justin Trudeau, the twenty-third and current Prime Minister of Canada. Trudeau has served as prime minister since November 4, 2015, having won three general elections. 

A liberal, Trudeau was successful in his first general election as leader of the Liberal Party, which he defeated then-Prime Minister Stephen Harper and the Conservatives in the general election of 2015 and formed a majority government. He was re-elected with a minority government in 2019 and again in 2021.

Trudeau has stood for election to the House of Commons five times and was elected each time (2008, 2011, 2015, 2019, 2021).  

Trudeau was elected leader of the Liberal Party in 2013, succeeding Michael Ignatieff, who retired from politics after losing the general election of 2011.

Summary 

Trudeau is the eighth prime minister from Quebec, the others being Sir John Abbott, Sir Wilfrid Laurier, Louis St. Laurent, Pierre Trudeau, Brian Mulroney, Jean Chrétien and Paul Martin.  He is also the fifth francophone prime minister, the others being Laurier, St. Laurent, Pierre Trudeau, and Chretien.

Trudeau was first elected to the House of Commons in 2008, at age 36.  The Liberals were in opposition after the 2008 and 2011 general elections.  Under Liberal leader Stéphane Dion, Trudeau was the Liberal critic for Citizenship and Immigration, Youth and Multiculturalism.  The next leader, Michael Ignatieff, appointed him critic for Sports and Post-Secondary Education.

In the 2011 general election, the Liberals under the leadership of Ignatieff were reduced to third party status, their worst showing in history.  Ignatieff lost his own seat and retired from politics.  Trudeau announced he would seek the party leadership.  In the 2013 vote, he won the leadership on the first ballot with 80% support.

Trudeau led the Liberals in the general election of 2015.  At dissolution, the Liberals were in third place in the Commons, behind the Conservative Party, which held a majority government, and the New Democratic Party, which formed the Official Opposition.  Trudeau led the Liberals to a majority government, defeating both the Conservatives led by Stephen Harper and the New Democrats led by Thomas Mulcair.  Trudeau's government was sworn in on November 4, 2015.

Trudeau has stood for election to the House of Commons five times (in 2008, 2011, 2015, 2019 and 2021), each time from the riding of Papineau, in Montreal, Quebec.

Federal general elections: 2015 to 2021 
Trudeau led the Liberal Party in three general elections. He won three (2015, 2019 and 2021). He won a majority government in the 2015 election, and two minority governments in the 2019 and 2021 elections.

Federal general election: 2015 

Trudeau led the Liberals in the 2015 election from third place in the House of Commons at dissolution to win a majority government, defeating incumbent Prime Minister Stephen Harper and the Conservatives.

1 Leader of a third party when election was called;  Prime Minister after election.
2 Prime Minister when election was called;  Member of Parliament after the election.
3 Leader of the Opposition when election was called; leader of a third party  after the election. 
4 Table does not include parties which received votes but did not elect any members.

Federal general election: 2019 

Trudeau led the Liberals in the 2019 election and was returned to office, but with a minority government. Andrew Scheer and the Conservatives won the popular vote.

1 Prime Minister when election was called; Prime Minister after election.
2 Leader of the Opposition when election was called; Leader of the Opposition after the election.
3 Table does not include parties which received votes but did not elect any members.

Federal general election: 2021 

Trudeau led the Liberals in the 2021 election and was returned to office, but with another minority government. Erin O'Toole and the Conservatives won the popular vote.

1 Prime Minister when election was called; Prime Minister after election.
2 Leader of the Opposition when election was called; Leader of the Opposition after the election.
3 Table does not include parties which received votes but did not elect any members.

Federal constituency elections:  2008 to 2021 

Trudeau has stood for election to the House of Commons five times (in 2008, 2011, 2015, 2019 and 2021). He was elected all five times, each time from the riding of Papineau, in Montreal, Quebec.

2008 Federal Election: Papineau 

 Elected. 
X Incumbent. 
1 Rounding error.

2011 Federal Election: Papineau 

 Elected. 
X Incumbent. 
1 Rounding error.

2015 Federal Election: Papineau 

 Elected. 
X Incumbent.

2019 Federal Election: Papineau 

 Elected. 
X Incumbent.
1 Rounding error.

2021 Federal Election: Papineau 

 Elected. 
X Incumbent.
1 Rounding error.

2013 Liberal Party leadership election 

Following the 2011 general election, the leader of the Liberals, Michael Ignatieff, announced his retirement. Trudeau entered the leadership contest, which was held in April, 2013.  The vote was based on the 308 Liberal riding associations, which each had 100 points.  All members of the party had the right to vote in the election through their riding associations.  The points for each riding association were allocated in proportion to the local vote.

1 Rounding error.

See also 

 Electoral history of Stephen Harper - Trudeau's predecessor as Prime Minister.

References

External links 

 Library of Parliament:  History of Federal Ridings since 1867
 Huffington Post:  Justin Trudeau Wins Liberal Leadership Race In Resounding Fashion
 Globe & Mail:  Justin Trudeau elected Liberal leader in a landslide.

Trudeau, Justin